Point Pleasant was a small village (now extinct) in Pine Township, Warren County, Indiana, located about a mile and a half southwest of Rainsville near the confluence of Big Pine Creek and Mud Pine Creek, a site currently known as Rocky Ford.  It was laid out by one John H. Bartlett and platted July 14, 1830, but never grew, and consisted only of Bartlett's residence, a liquor store and perhaps a saw mill.  An 1883 county history describes Point Pleasant, but notes that "this was a paper town only."

Geography 
Point Pleasant is located in the northwest half of the northeast quarter of section 33, township 23, range 8.

References 
 Goodspeed, Weston A. (1883), "Towns and Villages of Warren County" in Counties of Warren, Benton, Jasper and Newton, Indiana: Historical and Biographical, Chicago: F. A. Battey & Co.
 Clifton, Thomas A. (editor) (1913), "Warren County, Indiana" in Past and Present of Fountain and Warren Counties, Indiana, Indianapolis: B. F. Bowen & Co.

Former populated places in Warren County, Indiana
Populated places established in 1830
Ghost towns in Indiana
1830 establishments in Indiana